Stephen Scherer (February 22, 1989 – October 3, 2010) was a Cadet with the class of 2011 at the United States Military Academy who competed in the 2008 Olympic Games in 10 metre air rifle.  Scherer was only 19 and still a plebe (freshman) at West Point when he qualified for the Beijing games.  Scherer transferred to Texas Christian University after leaving West Point.

Stephen's younger sister Sarah Scherer is also a sports shooter who competed in the 10 metre air rifle of 2012 Summer Olympics and 2016 Summer Olympics.

Death
Scherer was found dead on October 3, 2010, in his off-campus apartment.  The cause of death was ruled to be a self-inflicted gunshot wound.

References

External links
Team USA profile

Shooters at the 2008 Summer Olympics
American male sport shooters
Olympic shooters of the United States
United States Military Academy alumni
Texas Christian University alumni

1989 births

2010 suicides

Suicides by firearm in Texas